Most of the areas which today are within modern Greece's borders were at some point in the past part of the Ottoman Empire. This period of Ottoman rule in Greece, lasting from the mid-15th century until the successful Greek War of Independence that broke out in 1821 and the proclamation of the First Hellenic Republic in 1822 (preceded by the creation of the autonomous Septinsular Republic in 1800), is known in Greek as Tourkokratia ("Turkish rule"). Some regions, however, like the Ionian islands, various temporary Venetian possessions of the Stato da Mar, or Mani peninsula in Peloponnese did not become part of the Ottoman administration, although the latter was under Ottoman suzerainty.

The Eastern Roman Empire, the remnant of the ancient Roman Empire which ruled most of the Greek-speaking world for over 1100 years, had been fatally weakened since the sacking of Constantinople by the Latin Crusaders in 1204.

The Ottoman advance into Greece was preceded by victory over the Serbs to its north. First, the Ottomans won the Battle of Maritsa in 1371. The Serb forces were then led by the King Vukašin of Serbia, the father of Prince Marko and the co-ruler of the last emperor from the Serbian Nemanjic dynasty. This was followed by an Ottoman victory in the 1389 Battle of Kosovo.

With no further threat by the Serbs and the subsequent Byzantine civil wars, the Ottomans besieged and took Constantinople in 1453 and then advanced southwards into Greece, capturing Athens in 1458. The Greeks held out in the Peloponnese until 1460, and the Venetians and Genoese clung to some of the islands, but by the early 16th century all of mainland Greece and most of the Aegean islands were in Ottoman hands, excluding several port cities still held by the Venetians (Nafplio, Monemvasia, Parga and Methone the most important of them). The mountains of Greece were largely untouched, and were a refuge for Greeks who desired to flee Ottoman rule and engage in guerrilla warfare.

The Cyclades islands, in the middle of the Aegean, were officially annexed by the Ottomans in 1579, although they were under vassal status since the 1530s. Cyprus fell in 1571, and the Venetians retained Crete until 1669. The Ionian Islands were never ruled by the Ottomans, with the exception of Kefalonia (from 1479 to 1481 and from 1485 to 1500), and remained under the rule of the Republic of Venice. It was in the Ionian Islands where modern Greek statehood was born, with the creation of the Republic of the Seven Islands in 1800.

Ottoman Greece was a multiethnic society. However, the Ottoman system of millets did not correspond to the modern Western notion of multiculturalism. The Greeks were given some privileges and freedom, but they were also suffering from the malpractices of its administrative personnel over which the central government had only remote and incomplete control. Despite losing their political independence, the Greeks remained dominant in the fields of commerce and business. The consolidation of Ottoman power in the 15th and 16th centuries rendered the Mediterranean safe for Greek shipping, and Greek shipowners became the maritime carriers of the Empire, making tremendous profits. After the Ottoman defeat at the Battle of Lepanto however, Greek ships often became the target of vicious attacks by Catholic (especially Spanish and Maltese) pirates.

This period of Ottoman rule had a profound impact in Greek society, as new elites emerged. The Greek land-owning aristocracy that traditionally dominated the Byzantine Empire suffered a tragic fate, and was almost completely destroyed. The new leading class in Ottoman Greece were the prokritoi (πρόκριτοι in Greek) called kocabaşis by the Ottomans. The prokritoi were essentially bureaucrats and tax collectors, and gained a negative reputation for corruption and nepotism. On the other hand, the Phanariots became prominent in the imperial capital of Constantinople as businessmen and diplomats, and the Greek Orthodox Church and the Ecumenical Patriarch rose to great power under the Sultan's protection, gaining religious control over the entire Orthodox population of the Empire, Greek, Albanian-speaking, Latin-speaking and Slavic.

Ottoman expansion

After the fall of Constantinople to the Ottomans in 1453, the Despotate of the Morea was the last remnant of the Byzantine Empire to hold out against the Ottomans. However, it fell to the Ottomans in 1460, completing the conquest of mainland Greece.

While most of mainland Greece and the Aegean islands was under Ottoman control by the end of the 15th century, Cyprus and Crete remained Venetian territory and did not fall to the Ottomans until 1571 and 1670 respectively. The only part of the Greek-speaking world that escaped Ottoman rule was the Ionian Islands, which remained Venetian until 1797. Corfu withstood three major sieges in 1537, 1571 and 1716 all of which resulted in the repulsion of the Ottomans.

Other areas that remained part of the Venetian Stato da Màr include Nafplio and Monemvasia until 1540, the Duchy of the Archipelago, centered on the islands of Naxos and Paros until 1579, Sifnos until 1617 and Tinos until 1715.

Ottoman rule

The consolidation of Ottoman rule was followed by two distinct trends of Greek migration. The first entailed Greek intellectuals, such as Basilios Bessarion, Georgius Plethon Gemistos and Marcos Mousouros, migrating to other parts of Western Europe and influencing the advent of the Renaissance (though the large scale migration of Greeks to other parts of Europe, most notably Italian university cities, began far earlier, following the Crusader capture of Constantinople). This trend had also effect on the creation of the modern Greek diaspora.

The second entailed Greeks leaving the plains of the Greek peninsula and resettling in the mountains, where the rugged landscape made it hard for the Ottomans to establish either military or administrative presence.

Administration

The Sultan sat at the apex of the government of the Ottoman Empire. Although he had the trappings of an absolute ruler, he was actually bound by tradition and convention.  These restrictions imposed by tradition were mainly of a religious nature. Indeed, the Qur'an was the main restriction on absolute rule by the sultan and in this way, the Qur'an served as a "constitution."

Ottoman rule of the provinces was characterized by two main functions.  The local administrators within the provinces were to maintain a military establishment and to collect taxes.  The military establishment was feudal in character. The Sultan's cavalry were allotted land, either large allotments or small allotments based on the rank of the individual cavalryman. All non-Muslims were forbidden to ride a horse which made traveling more difficult. The Ottomans divided Greece into six sanjaks, each ruled by a Sanjakbey accountable to the Sultan, who established his capital in Constantinople in 1453.

The conquered land was parceled out to Ottoman soldiers, who held it as feudal fiefs (timars and ziamets) directly under the Sultan's authority. This land could not be sold or inherited, but reverted to the Sultan's possession when the fief-holder (timariot) died. During their life-times they served as cavalrymen in the Sultan's army, living well on the proceeds of their estates with the land being tilled largely by peasants. Many Ottoman timariots were descended from the pre-Ottoman Christian nobility, and shifted their allegiance to the Ottomans following the conquest of the Balkans. Conversion to Islam was not a requirement, and as late as the fifteenth century many timariots were known to be Christian, although their numbers gradually decreased over time.

The Ottomans basically installed this feudal system right over the top of the existing system of peasant tenure.  The peasantry remained in possession of their own land and their tenure over their plot of land remained hereditary and inalienable.  Nor was any military service ever imposed on the peasant by the Ottoman government. All non-Muslims were in theory forbidden from carrying arms, but this was ignored. Indeed, in regions such as Crete, almost every man carried arms.

Greek Christian families were, however, subject to a system of brutal forced conscription known as the devshirme. The Ottomans required that male children from Christian peasant villages be conscripted and enrolled in the corps of Janissaries for military training in the Sultan's army. Such recruitment was sporadic, and the proportion of children conscripted varied from region to region. The practice largely came to an end by the middle of the seventeenth century.

Under the Ottoman system of government, Greek society was at the same time fostered and restricted. With one hand the Turkish regime gave privileges and freedom to its subject people; with the other it imposed a tyranny deriving from the malpractices of its administrative personnel over which it exercised only remote and incomplete control.  In fact the “rayahs” were downtrodden and exposed to the vagaries of Turkish administration and sometimes to the Greek landlords. The term rayah came to denote an underprivileged, tax-ridden and socially inferior population.

Economy

 

The economic situation of the majority of Greece deteriorated heavily during the Ottoman era of the country. Life became ruralized and militarized. Heavy burdens of taxation were placed on the Christian population, and many Greeks were reduced to subsistence farming whereas during prior eras the region had been heavily developed and urbanized. The exception to this rule was in Constantinople and the Venetian-held Ionian islands, where many Greeks lived in prosperity.

After about 1600, the Ottomans resorted to military rule in parts of Greece, which provoked further resistance, and also led to economic dislocation and accelerated population decline. Ottoman landholdings, previously fiefs held directly from the Sultan, became hereditary estates (chifliks), which could be sold or bequeathed to heirs. The new class of Ottoman landlords reduced the hitherto free Greek farmers to serfdom, leading to depopulation of the plains, and to the flight of many people to the mountains, in order to escape poverty.

Religion

The Sultan regarded the Ecumenical Patriarch of the Greek Orthodox Church as the leader of all Orthodox, Greeks or not, within the empire. The Patriarch was accountable to the Sultan for the good behavior of the Orthodox population, and in exchange he was given wide powers over the Orthodox communities, including the non-Greek Slavic peoples. The Patriarch controlled the courts and the schools, as well as the Church, throughout the Greek communities of the empire. This made Orthodox priests, together with the local magnates, called Prokritoi or Dimogerontes, the effective rulers of Greek towns and cities. Some Greek towns, such as Athens and Rhodes, retained municipal self-government, while others were put under Ottoman governors. Several areas, such as the Mani Peninsula in the Peloponnese, and parts of Crete (Sfakia) and Epirus, remained virtually independent.

During the frequent Ottoman–Venetian Wars, the Greeks sided with the Venetians against the Ottomans, with a few exceptions. The Patriarchate of Constantinople in general remained loyal to the Ottomans against the western threats (as for example during the Dionysios Skylosophos revolt, etc). The Orthodox Church assisted greatly in the preservation of the Greek heritage, and adherence to the Greek Orthodox faith became increasingly a mark of Greek nationality.

As a rule, the Ottomans did not require the Greeks to become Muslims, although many did so on a superficial level in order to avert the socioeconomic hardships of Ottoman rule or because of the alleged corruption of the Greek clergy. The regions of Greece which had the largest concentrations of Ottoman Greek Muslims were Macedonia, notably the Vallaades, neighboring Epirus, and Crete (see Cretan Muslims). Under the millet logic, Greek Muslims, despite often retaining elements of their Greek culture and language, were classified simply as "Muslim", although most Greek Orthodox Christians deemed them to have "turned-Turk" and therefore saw them as traitors to their original ethno-religious communities.

Some Greeks either became New Martyrs, such as Saint Efraim the Neo-Martyr or Saint Demetrios the Neo-martyr while others became Crypto-Christians (Greek Muslims who were secret practitioners of the Greek Orthodox faith) in order to avoid heavy taxes and at the same time express their identity by maintaining their secret ties to the Greek Orthodox Church. Crypto-Christians officially ran the risk of being killed if they were caught practicing a non-Muslim religion once they converted to Islam.  There were also instances of Greeks from theocratic or Byzantine nobility embracing Islam such as John Tzelepes Komnenos and Misac Palaeologos Pasha.

Treatment of Christian subjects varied greatly under the rule of the Ottoman Sultans. Bayezid I, according to a Byzantine historian, freely admitted Christians into his society while trying to grow his empire, in the early Ottoman period. Later, although the Turkish ruler attempted to pacify the local population with a restoration of peacetime rule of law, the Christian population also became subject to special taxes and the tribute of Christian children to the Ottoman state to feed the ranks of the Janissary corps.  Violent persecutions of Christians did nevertheless take place under the reign of Selim I (1512-1520), known as Selim the Grim, who attempted to stamp out Christianity from the Ottoman Empire. Selim ordered the confiscation of all Christian churches, and while this order was later rescinded, Christians were heavily persecuted during his era.

Taxation and the "tribute of children"

Greeks paid a land tax and a heavy tax on trade, the latter taking advantage of the wealthy Greeks to fill the state coffers. Greeks, like other Christians, were also made to pay the jizya, or Islamic poll-tax which all non-Muslims in the empire were forced to pay instead of the Zakat that Muslims must pay as part of the 5 pillars of Islam. Failure to pay the jizya could result in the pledge of protection of the Christian's life and property becoming void, facing the alternatives of conversion, enslavement, or death.

Like in the rest of the Ottoman Empire, Greeks had to carry a receipt certifying their payment of jizya at all times or be subject to imprisonment. Most Greeks did not have to serve in the Sultan's army, but the young boys that were taken away and converted to Islam were made to serve in the Ottoman military. In addition, girls were taken in order to serve as odalisques in harems.

These practices are called the "tribute of children" (devshirmeh) (in Greek παιδομάζωμα paidomazoma, meaning "child gathering"), whereby every Christian community was required to give one son in five to be raised as a Muslim and enrolled in the corps of Janissaries, elite units of the Ottoman army. There was much resistance to this.  For example, Greek folklore tells of mothers crippling their sons to avoid their abduction. Nevertheless, entrance into the corps (accompanied by conversion to Islam) offered Greek boys the opportunity to advance as high as governor or even Grand Vizier.

Opposition of the Greek populace to taxing or paidomazoma resulted in grave consequences. For example, in 1705 an Ottoman official was sent from Naoussa in Macedonia to search and conscript new Janissaries and was killed by Greek rebels who resisted the burden of the devshirmeh. The rebels were subsequently beheaded and their severed heads were displayed in the city of Thessaloniki. In some cases, it was greatly feared as Greek families would often have to relinquish their own sons who would convert and return later as their oppressors. In other cases, the families bribed the officers to ensure that their children got a better life as a government officer.

Influence to tradition

After the 16th century, many Greek folk songs (dimotika) were produced and inspired from the way of life of the Greek people, brigands and the armed conflicts during the centuries of Ottoman rule. Klephtic songs (Greek: Κλέφτικα τραγούδια), or ballads, are a subgenre of the Greek folk music genre and are thematically oriented on the life of the klephts. Prominent conflicts were immortalised in several folk tales and songs, such as the epic ballad To tragoudi tou Daskalogianni of 1786, about the resistance warfare under Daskalogiannis.

Emergence of Greek nationalism

Over the course of the eighteenth century Ottoman landholdings, previously fiefs held directly from the Sultan, became hereditary estates (chifliks), which could be sold or bequeathed to heirs. The new class of Ottoman landlords reduced the hitherto free Greek peasants to serfdom, leading to further poverty and depopulation in the plains.

On the other hand, the position of educated and privileged Greeks within the Ottoman Empire improved greatly in the 17th and 18th centuries. From the late 1600s Greeks began to fill some of the highest and most important offices of the Ottoman state. The Phanariotes, a class of wealthy Greeks who lived in the Phanar district of Constantinople, became increasingly powerful. Their travels to Western Europe as merchants or diplomats brought them into contact with advanced ideas of liberalism and nationalism, and it was among the Phanariotes that the modern Greek nationalist movement was born. Many Greek merchants and travelers were influenced by the ideas of the French revolution and a new Age of Greek Enlightenment was initiated at the beginning of the 19th century in many Ottoman-ruled Greek cities and towns.

Greek nationalism was also stimulated by agents of Catherine the Great, the Orthodox ruler of the Russian Empire, who hoped to acquire Ottoman territory, including Constantinople itself, by inciting a Christian rebellion against the Ottomans. However, during the Russian-Ottoman War which broke out in 1768, the Greeks did not rebel, disillusioning their Russian patrons. The Treaty of Kuchuk-Kainarji (1774) gave Russia the right to make "representations" to the Sultan in defense of his Orthodox subjects, and the Russians began to interfere regularly in the internal affairs of the Ottoman Empire. This, combined with the new ideas let loose by the French Revolution of 1789, began to reconnect the Greeks with the outside world and led to the development of an active nationalist movement, one of the most progressive of the time.

Greece was peripherally involved in the Napoleonic Wars, but one episode had important consequences. When the French under Napoleon Bonaparte seized Venice in 1797, they also acquired the Ionian Islands, thus ending the four hundredth year of Venetian rule over the Ionian Islands. The islands were elevated to the status of a French dependency called the Septinsular Republic, which possessed local autonomy. This was the first time Greeks had governed themselves since the fall of Trebizond in 1461.

Among those who held office in the islands was John Capodistria, destined to become independent Greece's first head of state. By the end of the Napoleonic Wars in 1815, Greece had re-emerged from its centuries of isolation. British and French writers and artists began to visit the country, and wealthy Europeans began to collect Greek antiquities. These "philhellenes" were to play an important role in mobilizing support for Greek independence.

Uprisings before 1821
[[Image:Chios aivaz.jpg|thumb|200px|Battle of Chios (Chesma), during the Orlov Revolt, by Ivan Aivazovsky (1848)]]
Greeks in various places of the Greek peninsula would at times rise up against Ottoman rule, mainly while taking advantage of wars the Ottoman Empire would engage in. Those uprisings were of mixed scale and impact. During the Ottoman–Venetian War (1463–1479), the Maniot Kladas brothers, Krokodelos and Epifani, were leading bands of stratioti on behalf of Venice against the Turks in Southern Peloponnese. They put Vardounia and their lands into Venetian possession, for which Epifani then acted as governor.

Before and after the victory of the Holy League in 1571 at the Battle of Lepanto a series of conflicts broke out in the peninsula such as in Epirus, Phocis (recorded in the Chronicle of Galaxeidi) and the Peloponnese, led by the Melissinos brothers and others. They were crushed by the following year. Short-term revolts of local level occurred throughout the region such as the ones led by metropolitan bishop Dionysius the Philosopher in Thessaly (1600) and Epirus (1611).

During the Cretan War (1645–1669), the Maniots would aid Francesco Morosini and the Venetians in the Peloponnese. Greek irregulars also aided the Venetians through the Morean War in their operations on the Ionian Sea and Peloponnese.

A major uprising during that period was the Orlov Revolt (Greek: Ορλωφικά) which took place during the Russo-Turkish War (1768–1774) and triggered armed unrest in both the Greek mainland and the islands. In 1778, a Greek fleet of seventy vessels assembled by Lambros Katsonis which harassed the Turkish squadrons in the Aegean sea, captured the island of Kastelorizo and engaged the Turkish fleet in naval battles until 1790.Dakin, Douglas The Greek Struggle for Independence, 1821–1833, University of California Press, (1973) pp. 26–27

Greek War of Independence
 

A secret Greek nationalist organization called the "Friendly Society" or "Company of Friends" (Filiki Eteria) was formed in Odessa in 1814. The members of the organization planned a rebellion with the support of wealthy Greek exile communities in Britain and the United States. They also gained support from sympathizers in Western Europe, as well as covert assistance from Russia. The organization secured Capodistria, who became Russian Foreign Minister after leaving the Ionian Islands, as the leader of the planned revolt. On March 25 (now Greek Independence Day) 1821, the Orthodox Bishop Germanos of Patras proclaimed a national uprising. The Ottomans, in retaliation orchestrated the Constantinople massacre of 1821 and similar pogroms in Smyrna.

Simultaneous risings were planned across Greece, including in Macedonia, Crete, and Cyprus. With the initial advantage of surprise, aided by Ottoman inefficiency and the Ottomans' fight against Ali Pasha of Tepelen, the Greeks succeeded in capturing the Peloponnese and some other areas. Some of the first Greek actions were taken against unarmed Ottoman settlements, with about 40% of Turkish and Albanian Muslim residents of the Peloponnese killed outright, and the rest fleeing the area or being deported.

The Ottomans recovered, and retaliated in turn with savagery, massacring the Greek population of Chios and other towns. This worked to their disadvantage by provoking further sympathy for the Greeks in Britain and France. The Greeks were unable to establish a strong government in the areas they controlled, and fell to fighting amongst themselves. Inconclusive fighting between Greeks and Ottomans continued until 1825 when the Sultan sent a powerful fleet and army who were mainly Bedouin and some Sudanese from Egypt under Ibrahim Pasha to suppress the revolution, promising to him the rule of Peloponnese, however they were eventually defeated in the Battle of Navarino in 1827.

The atrocities that accompanied this expedition, together with sympathy aroused by the death of the poet and leading philhellene Lord Byron at Messolongi in 1824, eventually led the Great Powers to intervene. In October 1827, the British, French and Russian fleets, on the initiative of local commanders, but with the tacit approval of their governments, destroyed the Ottoman fleet at the Battle of Navarino. This was the decisive moment in the war of independence.

In October 1828, the French landed troops in the Peloponnese to evacuate it from Ibrahim's army, while Russia was since April at war against the Ottomans. Under their protection, the Greeks were able to reorganize, form a new government and defeat the Ottomans in the Battle of Petra, the final battle of the war. They then advanced to seize as much territory as possible before the Western powers imposed a ceasefire.

A conference in London in 1830 proposed a fully independent Greek state (and not autonomous as previously proposed). The final borders were defined during the London Conference of 1832 with the northern frontier running from Arta to Volos, and including only Euboia and the Cyclades among the islands. The Greeks were disappointed at these restricted frontiers, but were in no position to resist the will of Britain, France and Russia, who had contributed mightily to Greek independence. By the Convention of May 11, 1832, Greece was finally recognized as a sovereign state.

Capodistria, who had been Greece's governor since 1828, had been assassinated by the Mavromichalis family in October 1831. To prevent further experiments with republican government, the Great Powers, especially Russia, insisted that Greece should be a monarchy, and the Bavarian Prince Otto was chosen to be its first King.

See also

 Dragomans
 Giaour
 Greek Muslims
 List of former mosques in Greece
 Ionian Islands under Venetian rule
 Phanariotes
 Rayah
 Sipahis
 Timeline of Orthodoxy in Greece (1453–1821)
 Hellenoturkism

References

Sources
 Finkel, Caroline. Osman's Dream: The Story of the Ottoman Empire, 1300-1923. New York: Basic Books, 2005. .
 Hobsbawm, Eric John. The Age of Revolution. New American Library, 1962. .
 Jelavich, Barbara. History of the Balkans, 18th and 19th Centuries. New York: Cambridge University Press, 1983. .
 Paroulakis, Peter H. The Greek War of Independence. Hellenic International Press, 1984.
 Shaw, Stanford. History of the Ottoman Empire and Modern Turkey: Volume I. Cambridge: Cambridge University Press, 1977.
 Vacalopoulos, Apostolis. The Greek Nation, 1453–1669''. Rutgers University Press, 1976.

External links
Macedonian Question: Turkish Domination

 

sv:Greklands historia#Osmanska tiden
Ottoman Empire